Arthur Whipple Jenks (1863–1922)  was an American Episcopal theologian.  He was born at Concord, New Hampshire, and graduated from Dartmouth College in 1884 and from the General Theological Seminary in 1896.  He received the degree of D.D. from Dartmouth in 1911.  He published Notes for Meditation on the Beatitudes of the Psalter (1914). Arthur Whipple Jenks was a clergyman, ecclesiastical writer and historian. Mr. Jenks was born to George Edwin Jenks, member of the N.H. State House of Representatives in 1873 and 1874. Mr. Jenks was a descendant of one of the oldest and most distinguished families of Rhode Island (sp. variations Jenks, Jencks, Jenckes). Mr. Jenks ancestors were members of the first Baptist church in America, established by Roger Williams, Providence, Rhode Island. SOURCE: "Genealogy of the Jenks Family of America".

1863 births
1922 deaths
American Episcopal theologians
Dartmouth College alumni